Alexander Blessin (born 28 May 1973) is a German professional football manager and former player who was most recently the head coach of Genoa.

Playing career
Blessin started his senior career with TSV Georgii Allianz Stuttgart. In 2001, he signed for Antalyaspor in the Turkish Süper Lig, where he made one league appearance. After that, he played for German clubs Wacker Burghausen, Lokomotive Leipzig, SC Pfullendorf, 1899 Hoffenheim, Sportfreunde Siegen, Jahn Regensburg, SSV Reutlingen, and SV Bonlanden before retiring in 2012.

Coaching career
Following his retirement as an active player, Blessin joined RB Leipzig as a youth coach in 2012. He left Leipzig in 2020 to accept an offer as the new manager of Oostende in the Belgian First Division A.

He completed his first season with Oostende in fifth place, which led to him being linked to clubs such as Sheffield United and Celtic, as well as being named manager of the year in the Belgian top flight.

On 19 January 2022, he was hired by Serie A club Genoa as the club's new head coach under a two-and-a-half year contract, after the Italian club paid a fixed fee to activate a buyout clause present in Blessin's contract with Oostende.

After failing to save Genoa from relegation, Blessin was confirmed in charge of the club for the 2022–23 Serie B season, with the goal to lead the Rossoblu promptly back to Serie A. On 6 December 2022, after a string of negative results, Blessin was dismissed from his role with immediate effect.

Managerial record

References 

1973 births
Living people
German footballers
TSF Ditzingen players
VfB Stuttgart players
Stuttgarter Kickers players
Antalyaspor footballers
SV Wacker Burghausen players
1. FC Lokomotive Leipzig players
SC Pfullendorf players
TSG 1899 Hoffenheim players
Sportfreunde Siegen players
SSV Jahn Regensburg players
Association football forwards
German expatriate footballers
Expatriate footballers in Turkey
German expatriate sportspeople in Turkey
German football managers
RB Leipzig non-playing staff
K.V. Oostende managers
Serie A managers
Genoa C.F.C. managers
German expatriate football managers
Expatriate football managers in Belgium
German expatriate sportspeople in Belgium
Expatriate football managers in Italy
German expatriate sportspeople in Italy
Footballers from Stuttgart